Steve Jackson (born c. 1953) is an American game designer whose creations include the role-playing game GURPS and the card game Munchkin.

Education
Steve Jackson is a 1974 graduate of Rice University, where he was a resident of Baker College before moving to Sid Richardson College when it opened in 1971. Jackson briefly attended the UT Law School, but left to pursue a career in game design.

Career

1970s: Metagaming Concepts
While working at Metagaming Concepts, Jackson developed Monsters! Monsters! (ca. 1976) based on a design by Ken St. Andre related to his Tunnels & Trolls role-playing game, and Godsfire (1976), a 3D space conquest game designed by Lynn Willis. Jackson's first design for the company was Ogre (1977), followed by G.E.V. (1978), which were set in the same futuristic universe that Jackson created.

Jackson became interested in Dungeons & Dragons, but found the various-sized dice irritating and the combat rules confusing and unsatisfying, and did not like the lack of tactics, so he designed Melee in response. Jackson joined the SCA to gain a better understanding of combat, but he soon became more interested and started fighting in SCA live-action combat as Vargskol, the Viking-Celt. Metagaming also published his game Wizard.

While designing Melee, Jackson realized this idea could be expanded into a full fantasy role-playing game to compete with D&D, and started working on The Fantasy Trip. While the game was originally scheduled for release in February 1978, the design and development required more work than Jackson had anticipated and the game was not released until March 1980. Howard Thompson, owner of Metagaming, decided to release The Fantasy Trip as four separate books instead of a boxed set, and changed his production methods so that Jackson would not be able to check the final proofs of the game. As a result of these actions, Jackson left Metagaming and founded Steve Jackson Games later that year.

1980s: Steve Jackson Games
His game Raid on Iran was an immediate success. Jackson bought The Space Gamer from Metagaming, and sold the rights to The Fantasy Trip to Metagaming. However, Thompson sought legal action against SJG for the rights to a short wargame called One-Page Bulge, and the lawsuit was settled with an agreement that was reached on November 26, 1981, which gave Jackson full rights to One-Page Bulge, and to Ogre and G.E.V. (whose ownership was questioned during the legal proceedings). Jackson tried to purchase The Fantasy Trip from Thompson after Metagaming ceased operations in April 1983, but Thompson declined the offered price of $250,000.

Jackson designed or co-designed many of the games published by SJ Games, including minigames such as Car Wars (1981) and Illuminati (1983), Undead (1981), and a published version of an informal game played on college campuses, called Killer. Jackson wanted to get into computer gaming software in the early 1980s, but instead wound up licensing gaming rights to Origin Systems, which produced games such as Autoduel (1985) and Ogre (1986).

Jackson became interested in designing and publishing a new roleplaying system in the middle of 1981, intending it to be detailed and realistic, logical and well-organized, and adaptable to any setting and any level of play; he announced GURPS in 1983, although the company's magazines delayed development of GURPS until 1984, making the combat system book Man to Man: Fantasy Combat from GURPS (1985) available for Origins 1985, and the full GURPS Basic Set appeared the next year in 1986. In 1995, Sean Punch took over for Jackson as the GURPS line editor.

Recent years
Jackson also designed the strategy card games Munchkin (2001) and Ninja Burger (2003), and the dice games Zombie Dice (2010) and Cthulhu Dice (2010), as well as Zombie Dice variants Trophy Buck (2011) and Dino Hunt Dice (2013).

Jackson has exhibited his elaborate Chaos Machine at several science fiction or wargaming conventions, including the 2006 Worldcon.

On May 11, 2012, Steve Jackson's Kickstarter funding project for the 6th Edition of his Ogre game became the highest grossing boardgame project at Kickstarter, with 5,512 backers pledging a total of $923,680. The success of the Ogre Designer's Edition project prompted the launch of a second successful project - running from Nov 29, 2019, through Jan 6, 2020 - to help re-launch the popular Car Wars franchise as well.

The two "Steve Jacksons"
Jackson is often mistaken for Steve Jackson, a British gamebook and video game writer who co-founded Games Workshop. The confusion is exacerbated by the fact that while the UK Jackson was co-creator of the Fighting Fantasy gamebook series, the US Jackson also wrote three books in this series (Scorpion Swamp, Demons of the Deep, and Robot Commando), and the books did not acknowledge that this was a different 'Steve Jackson'.

1990 Secret Service incident and legal actions 

On March 1, 1990, the United States Secret Service raided the offices of Steve Jackson Games based on suspicion of illegal hacker activity by game designer Loyd Blankenship, and seized (among other materials and media) his manuscript for GURPS Cyberpunk; when Jackson went to Secret Service headquarters the next day to retrieve his book drafts, he was told that GURPS Cyberpunk was a "handbook for computer crime", despite his protestations that it was just a game. Through the newly created civil-rights organization Electronic Frontier Foundation, SJG filed a lawsuit against the government, which went to trial in 1993 as Steve Jackson Games, Inc. v. United States Secret Service. SJG won the lawsuit, receiving $50,000 in damages.

Personal interests 

Jackson is an avid collector of Lego (especially pirate-themed ) sets. He has written a miniatures game that uses Pirate sets, Evil Stevie's Pirate Game, and has run it at several conventions.

Jackson has combined his fondness for model trains and LEGO through the LEGO train community and has been an active member of several LEGO users groups including TBRR (Texas Brick Railroad) and the Texas LEGO Users Group.

Honors
Jackson has received over a dozen Origins Awards.  
In 1982, he became the youngest game designer to be inducted into the Charles Roberts Awards Hall of Fame. 
His role-playing game GURPS and card game Munchkin were named to the Origins Hall of Fame for 1999 and 2012 respectively.
He was honored as a "famous game designer" by being featured as the king of clubs in Flying Buffalo's 2011 Famous Game Designers Playing Card Deck.

References

External links

  at SJgames.com
Steve Jackson: Biography and Public Warning at SJgames.com
Steve Jackson Games v. US Secret Service (1990 to 1993 legal case) at SJgames.com
 
 

Interview by Tom Vasel, April 2005

1953 births
Living people
Role-playing game designers
Board game designers
Rice University alumni
Discordians
American gamebook writers
Fighting Fantasy
GURPS writers
American game designers